Novi Kozjak is a village in northern Serbia. It is situated in the Alibunar municipality, in the South Banat District, Vojvodina province. The village has a Serb ethnic majority (90.49%) and a population of 650 people (2011 census).

Name

In Serbian, the village is known as Novi Kozjak (Нови Козјак), in Hungarian as Ferdinándfalva, and in German as Ferdinandsdorf.

Until 1947, the official name of the village was Ferdin, which is still in use by many inhabitants. The name Novi Kozjak was given in memory of a village of that name destroyed during the Second World War, which was named after the Kozjak mountain in North Macedonia.

See also
List of places in Serbia
List of cities, towns and villages in Vojvodina

References

Slobodan Ćurčić, Broj stanovnika Vojvodine, Novi Sad, 1996.
http://media.popis2011.stat.rs/2011/prvi_rezultati.pdf

Populated places in South Banat District
Populated places in Serbian Banat
Alibunar